Oliver Reilly (1936 - 4 April 2009) was an Irish Gaelic footballer. His league and championship career with the Louth senior team lasted seven seasons from 1955 until 1962.

Born in Ardee, County Louth, Reilly was raised in a strong Gaelic football household. His father, Stephen Reilly, won a Leinster medal with the Louth junior team in 1912.

Reilly first played competitive Gaelic football with the Hunterstown Rovers club. He won a county minor championship medal in 1954 before later joining the club's adult team. Reilly won a county junior championship medal in 1959.

Reilly made his first appearance on the inter-county scene as a member of the Louth minor team in 1954. He later joined the Louth junior team before making his senior debut during the 1955-56 league. Over the following seven seasons Reilly enjoyed much success, culminating with the winning of a set of All-Ireland and Leinster medals in 1957. A gall stones operation hastened his retirement from inter-county Gaelic football in 1962. He is the father of Hollywood film director Fergal Reilly.

Honours

Hunterstown Rovers
Louth Junior Football Championship (1): 1959
Louth Minor Football Championship (1): 1954

Louth
All-Ireland Senior Football Championship (1): 1957
Leinster Senior Football Championship (1): 1957

References

1936 births
2009 deaths
Louth inter-county Gaelic footballers
People from Ardee